Mont Blanc Restaurant is a former restaurant in London where leading writers including Hilaire Belloc, G. K. Chesterton, Joseph Conrad and John Galsworthy met regularly in the early years of the 20th century.

History
The restaurant was located at 16 Gerrard Street in the Soho district of central London. It was closed in 1928.

Mont Blanc circle
Writer, critic and publisher Edward Garnett held regular Tuesday lunches at the restaurant where he nurtured the talent of many literary figures such as DH Lawrence, John Galsworthy and Liam O'Flaherty. Chesterton and Belloc met at the restaurant in 1900 and subsequently developed a close friendship, apparently sealed over a bottle of Moulin-a-Vent. In 1912, through Garnett's 'circle' of friends, Richard Curle was first introduced to Conrad and became his protégé, literary assistant and close friend.

Commemorative Plaque
In July 2010 the City of Westminster decided to commemorate the restaurant with one of its Commemorative Green Plaques. The circular plaque reads:

References

External links
 Open Plaques.

 

Defunct restaurants in London
History of the City of Westminster
Cultural heritage of the United Kingdom
Historical markers
Restaurants in London